Yuxarı Ağalı is a village and municipality in the Bilasuvar Rayon of Azerbaijan. It has a population of 1000.

References

Populated places in Bilasuvar District